Yingjie Guo (born 1957) is an academic in Australia. He is a professor of Chinese Studies at the University of Sydney, and former chair of its Chinese Studies department. He has studied nationalism, class, and inequality in China. He has BA and MA degrees from Shanghai International Studies University, and a doctorate from the University of Tasmania. He was named Fellow of the Institute of Electrical and Electronics Engineers (IEEE) in 2014 for contributions to smart, reconfigurable and high gain antennas for broadband wireless communications systems.

Publications
As co-author with W. Sun:

Unequal China: The Political Economy and Cultural Politics of Inequality. London and New York: Routledge, 2013.

As editor:

Handbook on Class and Social Stratification in China. Cheltenham: Edward Elgar Publishing, 2016.

References

1957 births
Living people
Australian sinologists
Shanghai International Studies University alumni
University of Tasmania alumni
Academic staff of the University of Technology Sydney
Fellow Members of the IEEE
Place of birth missing (living people)